The 2018 Mid-Eastern Athletic Conference men's basketball tournament was the postseason men's basketball tournament for the Mid-Eastern Athletic Conference. The tournament was held from March 5–10, 2018 at the Norfolk Scope in Norfolk, Virginia. No. 6 seed North Carolina Central defeated No. 1 seed Hampton in the championship game to win the tournament and receive the conference's automatic bid to the NCAA tournament.

Seeds 
Teams were seeded by record within the conference, with a tiebreaker system to seed teams with identical conference records. The top three teams received a first round bye.

Schedule

Bracket

* denotes overtime period

References

2017–18 Mid-Eastern Athletic Conference men's basketball season
MEAC men's basketball tournament
2018 in sports in Virginia
Basketball competitions in Norfolk, Virginia
College basketball tournaments in Virginia